Kiatiyot Chalarmkhet, was born 2 November 1989. Nickname MIX. He is now playing for Thailand national futsal team.

As a promising youngster, he scored 3 goals in 3 games of AFC Futsal championship first round, even though he had given short opportunity to play in each game.

References 

AFC Futsal Championship 2008
TFL Thailand Futsal League

Kiatiyot Chalarmkhet
1989 births
Living people
Kiatiyot Chalarmkhet
Kiatiyot Chalarmkhet
Southeast Asian Games medalists in futsal
Competitors at the 2007 Southeast Asian Games
Kiatiyot Chalarmkhet